The České Budějovice Half Marathon is an annual half marathon race which takes place in early June in České Budějovice, Czech Republic. Known as the Mattoni České Budějovice Half Marathon, it is a part of RunCzech running circuit.

The course winds through České Budějovice city centre and along the Vltava river. The inaugural edition of the event was held in 2012. In 2013, almost 2 000 runners participated in the race.

The course records are held by Daniel Chebii and Tadelech Bekele. In 2012, České Budějovice was only the second race in Czech lands to see a half marathon completed below one-hour mark.

Past winners

Key:

References

External links

 České Budějovice Half Marathon official website

Half marathons
Athletics competitions in the Czech Republic
Recurring sporting events established in 2012
Sport in České Budějovice
2012 establishments in the Czech Republic
Summer events in the Czech Republic